The Skin Game may refer to:

 The Skin Game (play), a play by John Galsworthy
 The Skin Game (1921 film), a 1921 Dutch film, based on the play
 The Skin Game (1931 film), a 1931 film directed by Alfred Hitchcock, also based on the play
 "The Skin Game", a song by Gary Numan from Machine and Soul

Skin Game
Skin Game may refer to: 
 Skin Game, a 1971 movie comedy starring James Garner and Louis Gossett, Jr.
 Skin Game (The Dresden Files), a Dresden Files novel by Jim Butcher
 Skin Game a 2009 paranormal romantic suspense novel by Ann Aguirre
See also

See also
Skin in the Game (disambiguation)
Skins game, a type of scoring for various sports